Torpedo Run! is a 1986 board game published by Milton Bradley in which the object is to destroy your opponents ships before they can destroy yours.  The game was part of Milton Bradley's Floor Wars Series.  The game was well known for its large board size and large playing pieces.

History and development
The game was released in 1986 in English and Spanish versions by Milton Bradley.

Gameplay

Game board
The game board for Torpedo Run! was very large (46.5" x 34.5") and contains squares like a chessboard or checkerboard with 10 rows and 8 columns. It was designed to be played on the floor or a very large table.  With the style of game play the floor was the preferred place since table top play could result in lost game pieces.

Pieces and setup
The game contained 2 battleships (1 gray, 1 tan), 6 cruisers (3 gray, 3 tan), and 2 submarine shooters (1 gray, 1 tan).  The battleships and cruisers had tower and gun pieces that were detachable, and needed to be mounted to the base hull of each ship by inserting a post with a hook down into a latch, held in tension by an internal rubber band. The latch was exposed to the outside of the ship through a narrow slit at the bottom of the hull, with all slits on only one side of the ship. The submarine could hold a column of tiny red plastic discs which could be fired at the larger ships by pulling a rubber band and post mechanism on the top of the submarine. Before play, the larger ships' hulls were loaded with the towers and guns, and the larger ships would be placed in any configuration with the slits facing the opponent. The submarines would be loaded with as many discs as could fit and the rubber band on the firing mechanism secured.

Winning
The object of the game was to use the submarine to fire discs at opposing ships, scoring direct hits by shooting into the slits at the base of each ship, triggering the latch mechanism which would eject the gun or tower above, indicating a hit. Each ship consisted of two or three sections depending on the size of the piece. Once all sections were popped that ship was considered destroyed. There are no turns, the players simply agree to begin firing on a count of 3, then fire as fast as they can in a race to eliminate their opponent's ships first, leading to a fast-paced, chaotic experience similar to a later Milton Bradley game, Crossfire.

See also
Milton Bradley Company
Milton Bradley
List of Milton Bradley Company Products
Crossfire

External links
Torpedo Run!
Torpedo Run! Commercial

Board games introduced in 1986
Milton Bradley Company games